Nets Hawk Katz is the IBM Professor of Mathematics at the California Institute of Technology.  He was a professor of Mathematics at Indiana University Bloomington until March 2013.

Katz earned a B.A. in mathematics from Rice University in 1990 at the age of 17.  He received his Ph.D. in 1993 under Dennis DeTurck at the University of Pennsylvania, with a dissertation titled "Noncommutative Determinants and Applications".

He is the author of several important results in combinatorics (especially additive combinatorics), harmonic analysis and other areas. In 2003, jointly with Jean Bourgain and Terence Tao, he proved that any subset of  grows substantially under either addition or multiplication. This result was followed by the subsequent work of Bourgain, Sergei Konyagin and Glibichuk, establishing that every approximate field is almost a field.

Somewhat earlier he was involved in establishing new bounds in connection with the dimension of Kakeya sets. Jointly with Izabella Łaba and Terence Tao he proved that the upper Minkowski dimension of Kakeya sets in 3 dimensions is strictly greater than 5/2, and jointly with Terence Tao he established new bounds in large dimensions.

In 2010, Katz along with Larry Guth published the results of their collaborative effort to solve the Erdős distinct distances problem, in which they found a "near-optimal" result, proving that a set of  points in the plane has at least  distinct distances. 

In 2012, he was named a Guggenheim fellow.  During 2011-2012, he was the managing editor of the Indiana University Mathematics Journal. In 2014, he was an invited speaker at the International Congress of Mathematicians at Seoul and gave a talk The flecnode polynomial: a central object in incidence geometry. In 2015, he received the Clay Research Award.

Work

References

External links
Nets Katz's personal web page, including info on research, teaching, etc.

Year of birth missing (living people)
Living people
Rice University alumni
Indiana University faculty
University of Pennsylvania alumni
California Institute of Technology faculty